Gottfried Michael Koenig (5 October 1926 – 30 December 2021) was a German-Dutch composer.

Biography
He attended and later lectured at the Darmstädter Ferienkurse (Darmstadt music summer schools). From 1954 to 1964 Koenig worked in the electronic studio of West German Radio (WDR) producing his electronic compositions Klangfiguren, Essay and Terminus 1 and wrote orchestral and chamber music. Furthermore, he assisted other composers, including Mauricio Kagel, Franco Evangelisti, György Ligeti (Artikulation), Herbert Brün and Karlheinz Stockhausen (with the realization of Gesang der Jünglinge and Kontakte).

From 1961 to 1965 Koenig taught at the Gaudeamus Foundation in Bilthoven, and from 1962 to 1964 at the Hochschule für Musik Köln. In 1964 Koenig moved to the Netherlands, where he taught at Utrecht University and was, until 1986, director and later chairman of the electronic music studio, which became the Institute of Sonology. Here he developed his computer composition programs Project 1 (1964) and Project 2 (1966), designed to formalise the composition of musical structure-variants. Both programs had a significant impact on the further development of algorithmic composition systems. Among his notable students are Jorge Antunes, Mario Bertoncini, Konrad Boehmer, Karl Gottfried Brunotte, Miguel Ángel Coria, Johannes Fritsch, Annea Lockwood, Luca Lombardi, Tomás Marco, Pierre Mariétan, Zoltán Pongrácz, Kees van Prooijen, Atli Heimir Sveinsson, Claude Vivier and Jan Vriend. 

His sound synthesis program SSP (started 1971) is based on the representation of sound as a sequence of amplitudes in time. It makes use of the methods of aleatoric and groupwise selection of elements employed in Project 1 and Project 2. He continued to produce electronic works (Terminus 2, the Funktionen series). These were followed by the application of his computer programs, resulting in chamber music (Übung for piano, the Segmente series, 3 ASKO Pieces, String Quartet 1987, String Trio) and works for orchestra (Beitrag, Concerti e Corali).

Six volumes of his theoretical writings were published between 1991 and 2008 under the title Ästhetische Praxis by Pfau Verlag; an Italian selection appeared under the title Genesi e forma (Rome: Semar, 1995), an English one under the title Process and Form (Hofheim: Wolke, 2018). Koenig taught Algorithmic Composition in 2002/03 at the Technical University of Berlin.

References

Works cited

Further reading

 Berg, Paul. 2009. "Composing Sound Structures with Rules". Contemporary Music Review 28, no. 1 (February): 75–87.
 Boehmer, Konrad. 2002. "Koenig—Sound Composition—Essay". Electroacoustic Music: Analytical Perspectives, edited by Thomas Licata, 59–71. Contributions to the Study of Music and Dance 63. Westport: Greenwood. .
 Boehmer, Konrad. 2006. "Doppelter Ausbruch: Über die Streichquartette 1959 und 1987 von Gottfried Michael Koenig". Neue Zeitschrift für Musik 167, no. 2 (March–April): 29–31.
 Essl, Karlheinz. 1989. "Zufall und Notwendigkeit. Anmerkungen zu Gottfried Michael Koenigs Streichquartett 1959 vor dem Hintergrund seiner kompositionstheoretischen Überlegungen". In Musik-Konzepte 66: Gottfried Michael Koenig, edited by Heinz-Klaus Metzger and Rainer Riehn, 35–76. Munich: Edition Text + Kritik.
 Fricke, Stefan. 2004. Gottfried Michael Koenig: Parameter und Protokolle seiner Musik. Saarbrücken: Pfau-Verlag. .
 Griffiths, Paul. 2002. "Koenig, Gottfried Michael". The Oxford Companion to Music, edited by Alison Latham. Oxford and New York: Oxford University Press. .
 Kennedy, Michael. 2006. The Oxford Dictionary of Music. Oxford and New York: Oxford University Press. .
 Metzger, Heinz-Klaus, and Rainer Riehn (eds.). 1989. Gottfried Michael Koenig. Musik-Konzepte 66. Munich: Edition Text + Kritik. .
 Ungeheuer, Elena. 1998. "Analoge Handschriften: Kompositorische Facetten des Kölner Studios für Elektronische Musik in den fünfziger Jahren". In Vorträge und Berichte vom KlangArt-Kongreß 1995 an der Universität Osnabrück, Fachbereich Erziehungs- und Kulturwissenschaften, edited by Bernd Enders and Niels Knolle, 83–95. Musik und Technologie 1. Osnabrück: Universitätsverlag Rasch. .
 Ungeheuer, Elena. 2000a. "Essay oder ein interaktiver Versuch zum Umgang mit Musik und Musikwissenschaft". In Musikkonzepte—Konzepte der Musikwissenschaft, 2 vols., edited by Kathrin Eberl and Wolfgang Ruf, 393–401. Kassel: Bärenreiter. .
 Ungeheuer, Elena. 2000b. "From the Elements to the Continuum: Timbre Composition in Early Electronic Music". Contemporary Music Review 10, no. 2:25–33.
 Tazelaar, Kees. 2013. "On the Threshold of Beauty: Philips and the Origins of Electronic Music in the Netherlands 1925–1965", chapters 10 and 12.
 Zey, Claudia Maria. 2000. "Die digitale spektrographisch basierte Visualisierung und Analyse der elektronischen Musik Gottfried Michael Koenigs am Beispiel der Komposition Essay – Komposition für elektronische Klänge (1957)". In Musik im virtuellen Raum: KlangArt-Kongreß 1997, edited by Bernd Enders and Joachim Stange-Elbe, 329–64. Osnabrück: Universitätsverlag Rasch. .

External links 
 
 Karlheinz Essl: "Garlands to Koenig", essl.at

1926 births
2021 deaths
20th-century classical composers
Twelve-tone and serial composers
Experimental composers
German classical composers
Dutch male classical composers
Dutch classical composers
German male classical composers
Dutch people of German descent
Musicians from Magdeburg
21st-century classical composers
20th-century German composers
21st-century German composers
20th-century German male musicians
21st-century German male musicians